Chevenez is a village and former municipality in the district of Porrentruy in the canton of Jura in Switzerland. Since 1 January 2009 it is a part of the new municipality Haute-Ajoie.

References

External links

Former municipalities of the canton of Jura